Kukshi Assembly constituency is one of the 230 Vidhan Sabha (Legislative Assembly) constituencies of Madhya Pradesh state in central India. It was founded in 1951 as one of the 79 Vidhan Sabha constituencies of the erstwhile Madhya Bharat state. It is reserved for candidates of the Scheduled tribes.

Overview
Kukshi (constituency number 198) is one of the 7 Vidhan Sabha constituencies located in Dhar district. This constituency covers the Kukshi nagar panchayat and part of Kukshi tehsil of the district.

Kukshi is part of Dhar Lok Sabha constituency along with seven other Vidhan Sabha segments, namely, Sardarpur, Gandhwani, Manawar, Dharampuri, Dhar and  Badnawar in this district and Dr. Ambedkar Nagar-Mhow in Indore district.

Members of Legislative Assembly

As a constituency of Madhya Bharat
1951,  Ratu Singh Indian National Congress

As a constituency of Madhya Pradesh

Note: 2011 was a by-poll.

Election results

2013 results

References

Assembly constituencies of Madhya Pradesh
Dhar district